The Hystricognathi are an infraorder of rodents, distinguished from other rodents by the bone structure of their skulls. The masseter medialis (a jaw muscle) passes partially through a hole below each eye socket (called the infraorbital foramen) and connects to the bone on the opposite side. This, together with their lack of an infraorbital plate and the relative size of the infraorbital foramen, distinguishes hystricognaths from other rodent groups.

The 18 families within the Hystricognathi are divided into two parvorders, the Phiomorpha and the Caviomorpha. The Caviomorpha are mostly native to South America, with a few species in the Caribbean and North America, while the Phiomorpha occur in the Old World.

Behavior
Play behavior has been observed in seven hystricognath families. The caviomorphs chase each other, play-wrestle, and gallop.  The longer-legged species chase more often than the shorter-legged species.  They also rotate their heads and body muscles as a form of play.

Phiomorphan hystricognath families
 Bathyergidae (African mole rats)
 Heterocephalidae (naked mole rats, monotypic taxon)
 Hystricidae (Old World porcupines)
 Petromuridae (dassie rat, monotypic taxon)
 Thryonomyidae (cane rats)

Caviomorphan hystricognath families
 Abrocomidae (chinchilla rats)
 Capromyidae (hutias)
 Caviidae (guinea pigs, wild cavies, and capybaras)
 Chinchillidae (chinchillas and viscachas)
 Ctenomyidae (tuco-tucos)
 Cuniculidae (pacas)
 Dasyproctidae (agoutis and acouchis)
 Dinomyidae (pacaranas and their fossil relatives, including some of megafaunal size)
 Echimyidae (spiny rats)
 Erethizontidae (New World porcupines)
 Myocastoridae (coypu)
 Octodontidae (13 species including the degus)

See also
 Sciurognathi
 Hystricomorpha

References

Citations

Sources 

 Alfred L. Gardner Curator of North American mammals and Chief of Mammal Section, National Biological Service,Smithsonian Institution, National Museum of Natural History, Washington, DC, USA   	 
 Charles A. Woods  Florida Museum of Natural History, University of Florida, Gainesville, FL 32611-2035  	 	 
 McKenna, Malcolm C. and Susan K. Bell  1997 Classification of mammals above the species level   631  Columbia University Press   New York, New York, USA     	 
 Wilson, Don E., and DeeAnn M. Reeder, eds.  1993 Mammal Species of the World: A Taxonomic and Geographic Reference, 2nd ed., 3rd printing xviii + 1207   Smithsonian Institution Press  	 Washington, DC, USA     Corrections were made to text at 3rd printing

External links
 https://web.archive.org/web/20061130080256/http://animaldiversity.ummz.umich.edu/site/topics/mammal_anatomy/rodent_jaws.html

 
Rodent taxonomy
Mammal infraorders
Extant Eocene first appearances